The Roman Catholic Diocese of Yanzhou/Yenchow is a diocese located in Yanzhou (Shandong) in the Ecclesiastical province of Jinan in China. The cathedral is now in the hands of the Patriotic Church of China.

History
 December 2, 1885: Established as Apostolic Vicariate of Southern Shantung 山東南境 from the Apostolic Vicariate of Shantung 山東
 December 3, 1924: Renamed as Apostolic Vicariate of Yanzhoufu 兖州府
 April 11, 1946: Promoted as Diocese of Yanzhou 兖州

Leadership
 Bishops of Yanzhou 兖州 (Roman rite)
 Bishop John Lu Pei-sen, (2011–present)
 Bishop Thomas Zhao Fengwu, S.V.D. (1993 - 2005)
 Bishop Theodore Schu, S.V.D. (舒德祿) (April 11, 1946 – August 24, 1965)
 Vicars Apostolic of Yanzhoufu 兖州府 (Roman Rite)
 Bishop Theodore Schu, S.V.D. (舒德祿) (November 19, 1936 – April 11, 1946)
 Bishop Augustin Henninghaus, S.V.D. (August 7, 1904 – June 1935)
 Vicars Apostolic of Southern Shantung 山東南境 (Roman Rite)
 Bishop Johann Baptist von Anzer, S.V.D. (January 4, 1886 – November 24, 1903)

References

 GCatholic.org
 Catholic Hierarchy

Roman Catholic dioceses in China
Religious organizations established in 1885
Roman Catholic dioceses and prelatures established in the 19th century
1885 establishments in China
Religion in Shandong